Lester Joseph Durel Jr. (born April 3, 1953), known as Joey Durel, is the former mayor of Lafayette, Louisiana. Elected in 2003, he became the second Republican mayor of his city and the second person elected as "City-Parish president" of the combined City of Lafayette and Lafayette Parish government.

References

1953 births
Living people
Businesspeople from Louisiana
University of Louisiana at Lafayette alumni
Mayors of Lafayette, Louisiana
Louisiana Republicans
Politicians from Lafayette, Louisiana